The  Gosagroprom Building is a building in Ufa, the capital of the republic of Bashkortostan, Russia. It is the headquarters of the Committee of construction and architecture, Committee of Transport and Roads and the Ministry of Youth and Sports.

The building also houses:
 Office of the Ministry of Industry and Trade of Russia in Bashkortostan
 Mission of the Russian Foreign Ministry in Ufa
 Mission of  the Liberal Democratic Party in Bashkortostan
 Women's Union of Bashkortostan

The building is served by a state enterprise "Management office buildings."

See also
Republic House, Bashkortostan

References

External links
 
 Interactive tour of the Administration of the President of Bashkortostan

Buildings and structures in Ufa
Government buildings in Russia